Sığırcı railway station is a railway station in the Balıkesir Province of Turkey. The station is located along the D.200 state highway, near the villages of Akçapınar (northeast), Doğruca (northwest) and Yenisığırcı (west). TCDD Taşımacılık operates a daily train from Bandırma to İzmir, the southbound 6th of September Express. The 17th of September Express, which operates along the same route, does not stop at Sığırcı.

References

External links
Station timetable
TCDD Taşımacılık

Railway stations in Balıkesir Province
Bandırma